The Ostana Prize – Writings in the Mother Tongue [in Italian: Ostana Premio Scritture in Lingua Madre], is an annual prize and cultural initiative organized by the Municipality of Ostana and by the Cultural Association Chambra d'Oc. It is dedicated to languages and to literary authors who use a "mother tongue", a present-day minority language of territorial belonging, in their works. The event began in 2008 and is held in Ostana, a municipality in the Valle Po (Italy), every year at the beginning of June. It is open to the public with free admission.

Categories of Ostana Prize
Every year, the Ostana Prize assigns prizes to authors selected all over the world according to different categories, some of which were added only in the recent editions: International Award, National Award, Award for the Occitan language, Young Writers Award, Special Award, Translation Award, Award for Musical Composition, Film Award.

For the International Award and the National Award the organizers select authors who have used in their works, in whole or in part, one of the minority languages recognized at national and international level.

Because of the geographical location of Ostana Prize in the Occitan Area (the municipality of Ostana is in fact part of the Occitan minority area in Italy) an author writing in the language is given a specific recognition.

The Special Award is conferred to an author who is particularly distinguished in the defense, promotion and dissemination of a minority language in danger of extinction.

The Translation Award is awarded to an author who has achieved distinction in the translation of writings to, or from, a minority language.

The Young Writers Award is given to an under-40 author who has achieved distinction in the field of literature and who is engaged in the promotion of his or her mother tongue.

In 2016 edition two awards to artistic career were added: The Award for Musical Composition which is awarded to an author who has been noteworthy in the field of composition in his or her native language, and The Film Award which is given to a filmmaker who made a cinematographic work in a minority language.

Duration of award ceremony
The Ostana Prize – Writings in Mother Tongue has a duration of three days during which the winning authors are invited by the organizers to reside in Ostana, in one of the existing facilities, and to take part in: meetings, debates, video projections, readings in minority languages, musical and artistic performances, photographic exhibitions, etc... 
The last day of the event the prizes to the individual authors are delivered.

The symbols of Ostana Prize
The prize consists of: a glass sculpture, specially created by the Italian artist Silvio Vigliaturo with the illustration of a nightingale, symbol of Occitan culture (in reference to the song "Se chanta"), accompanied by a gold medal created by Marco Gioielli which represents the Occitan cross.

Objectives
The objectives of Ostana Prize are:

 celebrating and bringing together authors (writers, poets, musicians, filmmakers, translators) who contribute to the promotion of enduring and emerging languages with their work,
 listening and make the public aware of the sound of endangered, yet eager to live, languages, in order to discover through these languages the histories and cultures of the people who speak them,
 highlighting the value of multilingualism through the live testimony of authors and artists from around the world.

The Writers
In the eight years of activity of the Award 48 writers have been invited; among those 8 were Occitan. The remaining 40 represented different languages.

The languages
The Ostana Prize has been awarded to representatives of minority languages such as: Friulian language, Slovene language, Cimbrian language, Ladin language, Armenian language, Sardinian language, Standard Tibetan, Basque language, Romani language, Totonacan languages, Catalan language, Huave language, Breton language, Sami languages, Hebrew language, Maltese language, Corsican language, Cheyenne language, Kurdish languages, Māori language, Galician language, Shuar language, Yoruba language, Frisian languages, Griko dialect e Occitan language.

Award winners

edition 1, year 2008
22–23 November
 Max Roqueta language: Occitan, Special Award
 Alfredo Conde language: Galician, International Award
 Carlo Sgorlon language: Friulian, National Award

edition 2, year 2010
19–20 June
 Gavino Ledda language: Sardinian, Special Award
 Witi Ihimaera language: Māori, International Award
 Boris Pahor language: Slovene, National Award
 Ives Rouquette language: Occitan, Award for the Occitan language
 Constantino Canales language: Huave, Young Writers Award
 Arturo Viano language: Occitan, Translation Award

edition 3, year 2011
3–5 June
 Vincenzo Consolo language: Sicilian, Special Award
 Harkaitz Cano language: Basque, International Award
 Andrea Nicolussi Gold language: Cimbrian, National Award
 Aurélia Lassaque language: Occitan, Award for the Occitan language
 Tuntiak Katan language: Shuar, Young Writers Award
 Reuven Miran language: Hebrew, Translation Award

edition 4, year 2012
2–3 June
 Sergio Salvi, writer, Special Award
 Kerttu Vuolab language: Sami, International Award
 Joseph Zoderer language: German, National Award
 Sergi Bec language: Occitan, Award for the Occitan language
 Maite Brazales language: Catalan, Young Writers Award
 Diegu Corràine language: Sardinian, Translation Award

edition 5, year 2013
1–2 June
 Chenreb Gyamtso, known as Nodreng language: Tibetan, Special Award
 Mehmet Altun language: Kurdish, International Award
 Rut Bernardi language: Ladin, National Award
 Joan Larzac language: Occitan, Award for the Occitan language
 Antony Heulin language: Breton, Young Writers Award
 Francesco Ferrucci language: Catalan, Translation Award

edition 6, year 2014
31 May – 2 June
 Marcel Courthiade language: Romani, Special Award
 Lance David Henson language: Cheyenne, International Award
 Franco Marchetta language: Friulian, National Award
 Danielle Julien language: Occitan, Award for the Occitan language
 Arno Camenisch language: Romansh, Young Writers Award
 Anthony Aquilina language: Maltese, Translation Award

edition 7, year 2015
30 May – 2 June
 Jun Tiburcio Perez Gonzales (Jun Tiburcio) language: Totonacan, Special Award
 Jacques Thiers language: Corsican, International Award
 Antonia Arslan language: Armenian, National Award
 James Thomas language: Occitan, Award for the Occitan language
 Niillas Holmberg language: Sami, Young Writers Award
 Clive Boutle Translation Award

edition 8, year 2016
2–5 June
 Kola Tubosun language: Yoruba, Special Award
 María Clara Sharupi Jua language: Shuar, International Award
 Salvatore Tommasi language: Griko, National Award
 Joan Ganiayre language: Occitan, Award for the Occitan language
 Tsead Bruinja language: West Frisian, Young Writers Award
 Lurdes Auzmendi language: Basque, Translation Award

Awards to artistic career
 Rocco De Santis language: Griko, Award for Musical Composition
 Renato Morelli Film Award

edition 9, year 2017
 Salem Zenia language: Amazigh-Kabyle, Special Award
 Joséphine Bacon language :Innu, International Award
 Francesco Severini language: linguistic minorities of Italy, National Award 
 Roland Pecout language: Occitan, Award for the Occitan language
 Erlend O. Nodtvedt language: Nynorsk, Giovani Award
 [[Gwyn Griffiths language: Welsh, Translation Award

Awards to artistic career
 Mans De Breish language: Award for Musical Composition in the Occitan language
 Samir Aït Belkacem language: Kabyle, Film award

edition 10, year 2018 

Bob Holman, a celebratory prize of the decennial
Juan Gregorio Regino, Special Award
 Adil Olluri, International Award
 Tatjana Rojc, Minority award for historical language of Italy.
 Matthieu Poitavin, Occitan Language Award
Doireann Ní Ghríofa, Giovani Award
 Aleksej Leontiev, Translation Award
 Joan Isaac, Prize for Musical Composition
 Asier Altuna, Cinema Award

edition 11, year 2019 

 Tilbert Dídac Stegmann, Special prize (Learning Romance, Slavic, Germanic languages through the EuroComRom method - The Seven Sieves - Germany)
Manuel Rivas, International award Galician language (Spain)
 Anna Maria Bacher, Historical linguistic minorities prize in Italy Walser language (Italy)
 Gérard Zuchetto, Occitan language Award Occitan language (France)
 Dariia "Neseni" Martynova, Youth Award Lingua even (Siberia, Russia) 
 Craig Patterson, Galician Language Translation Prize (Spain)
Franca Masu, Music composition award, Catalan language of Alghero (Italy)
Marcelo Martinessi, Cinema award, Guarani language (Paraguay)

edition 12 (2020) and edition 13 (2021) 
Both editions held without awardees because of the Covid19 pandemic.

edition 14, 2022 

 Diego Marani (Europanto language-game) - Special Prize
 Francho Nagore Laín (Aragonese language – Spain) - Interanational Prize 
 Rosalba Perini (Friulan language) - Historic Linguistic Minorities Award in Italy
 Bhuchung D. Sonamm (Tibetan language – Nepal) - Youth Award
 Stefania Maria Ciminelli (Catalan language – Spain) - Translation Award
 Paulina Kamakine (Occitan language – France) - Occitan language award
 Marine Lavigne (Breton language – France) - Music Composition Award
 Fredo Valla (Occitan language – Italy) - Cinema award.

References

Ostana
Awards established in 2008
2008 establishments in Italy